Jennifer Thym is an American writer, film director and producer currently based in Hong Kong. Thym's award winning films include "Bloodtraffic" and "Jasmine".

Early life 
Thym was born in New York City, New York. Thym is of Cantonese and Taiwanese heritage. Thyme grew up in the rural South in U.S.

Career 
Under her banner RockGinger, Thym has written, directed and produced a short film entitled "Bloodtraffick" starring Grace Huang and Kirt Kishita. The film won a "Best Actress" award for Grace Huang at the HollyShorts Film Festival, received Best Short Film, Best Cinematography and Best Editing awards at the Salty Horror International Film Festival, an excellence in directing, cinematography and original screenplay at the Stiletto Film Fest, Best Cinematography at the Viscera Film Festival, and has screened at film festivals such as the San Diego Asian Film Festival, the Philadelphia Asian American Film Festival, the Gen Con Indy Film Festivala, the Action On Film International Film Festival and more.

A feature film produced by Thym and directed by Dax Phelan entitled Jasmine was released in 2011, is set in Hong Kong and which also stars Jason Tobin, Grace Huang, Eugenia Yuan, Sarah Lian and Byron Mann.

Web series 
Thym has also directed, written and created an award-winning and nominated web series, Lumina. The web series has also been nominated for best editing from the Webby Awards as well as best cinematography from the Streamy Awards, and best directing and writing nominations for Thym from the Indie Soap Awards and best actor nominations for Michael Chan and JuJu Chan from the American Soap World Awards.

Thym has also directed, written and created a comedy web series entitled Mister French Taste starring Osric Chau, Sarah Lian and Oliver Malet. With over 1.4 million views worldwide, Mister French Taste takes a hilarious look at the practice of etiquette coaching in Hong Kong.

Filmography

Film 
 2015 Jasmine

Television 
 2009 Lumina - as writer, director, producer.
 2012 Mister French Taste. Season 1 episode "Chateau Decadence" - as director.

References

External links

Jen Thym on Twitter
Rock Ginger Official Site

Hong Kong film directors
Hong Kong film producers
Hong Kong women artists
Living people
Year of birth missing (living people)